Michael Mina (born 1969) is an American celebrity chef, restaurateur, and cookbook author. He is the founder of the Mina Group, a restaurant management company operating over 40 restaurants worldwide. He is the executive chef at his two namesake restaurants in San Francisco and Las Vegas, which each have earned a star in the Michelin Guide. He authored his first cookbook in 2006 and has made numerous television appearances.

Early life and education 
Michael Mina was born in 1969 in Cairo, Egypt. He immigrated to the United States when he was young and was raised in Ellensburg, Washington.

Mina started working in a French kitchen in his hometown when he was 16. After high school, Mina attended the University of Washington and worked in the restaurant at the Space Needle, where he received his first exposure to working in a busy restaurant. He left after one year to attend Culinary Institute of America in Hyde Park, New York.

Career
After attending the Culinary Institute of America, he worked at Tribeca Grill and Aureole restaurants in New York City. He worked in Los Angeles at the Bel Air Hotel with Executive Chef George Morrone. Mina followed Morrone to San Francisco in 1990 to help with Aqua. Following Morrone's departure from Aqua, Mina became executive chef and received numerous awards and accolades.

Michael Mina's approach to cooking revolves around balancing four basic elements: spice, sweetness, acidity, and richness.

Michael Mina has cooked for three United States Presidents.

In 2002, Michael Mina met Andre Agassi in Mina's restaurant in San Francisco; they partnered to start The Mina Group and open concept restaurants such as Nobhill Tavern and Seablue in Las Vegas.

In 2009, Mina opened RN74 in San Francisco, which was named for Route Nationale 74, the highway that passes through France's Burgundy region.

In September 2012, Michael Mina launched Cook Taste Eat, a digital culinary media company that delivers video content through daily emails and videos. Alongside co-host Michelle Branch, Michael Mina teaches viewers how to prepare restaurant-quality meals in their kitchen. Through daily emails and videos, viewers learn each meal one dish at a time, along with useful behind-the-scenes culinary tips and tricks.

In 2018, he opened Mina Brasserie in the DIFC financial district of Dubai.

Michael Mina is married to Diane Mina, who has her own line of Bloody Mary Mixes

Michael Mina (San Francisco) 
In October 2006, Mina's San Francisco restaurant, Michael Mina, was awarded two Michelin stars, one of only four restaurants in the San Francisco Bay Area, to be a two-star recipient. For the 2010 San Francisco Bay Area Michelin Guide, Mina's San Francisco restaurant, Michael Mina, was demoted to one Michelin star, then it was excluded altogether from the starred list in 2011. For 2012, it returned to the starred list with one Michelin star.

In October 2011, it was awarded Esquire Magazine's Restaurant of the Year. In 2018, the Michael Mina flagship restaurant shifted to include more Middle Eastern food on the menus.

Books
In November 2006, Michael Mina released his first cookbook, Michael Mina: The Cookbook. The book presents a number of recipes with his "Trio concept" as well as his "classic" dishes.

Restaurants

Active restaurants 

 Michael Mina. Bellagio. Las Vegas, Nevada
 Stripsteak. Las Vegas, Nevada
 Stripsteak Waikiki, Honolulu, Hawaii
 Bungalow Kitchen. Tiburon, California
 Bungalow Kitchen, Long Beach, California
 Bourbon Steak. The Americana at Brand. Glendale, California
 Bourbon Steak. Fairmont Turnberry Isle Resort & Club, Aventura, Florida
 Bourbon Steak. The Fairmont Scottsdale Princess. Scottsdale, Arizona
 Bourbon Steak. Levi's Stadium, Santa Clara, California 
 Bourbon Steak. JW Marriott, Nashville, Tennessee
 Bourbon Steak. Seattle, Washington 
 Clock Bar. San Francisco
 Bourbon Steak. Four Seasons Hotel, Washington, DC
 Mina Brasserie. Four Seasons Hotel DIFC, Dubai
 PABU. San Francisco
 Wit & Wisdom. Four Seasons Hotel, Baltimore, Maryland
 Wit & Wisdom Sonoma.  The Lodge at Sonoma Resort, Autograph Collection, Sonoma, California
 The Handle Bar. Jackson Hole, Wyoming
 Michael Mina Stripsteak. Fontainebleau Hotel, Miami Beach, Florida
 Bardot Brasserie. Aria Resort & Casino. Las Vegas, Nevada
 Mina Test Kitchen, San Francisco, California
 Locale Market, St. Petersburg, Florida
 PABU. Boston, Massachusetts
 Mina's Fish House. Four Seasons Hotel, Ko’Olina, Oahu
 International Smoke, San Francisco, California
 International Smoke Del Mar, One Paseo, Carmel Valley, San Diego
 International Smoke, MGM Grand, Las Vegas, Nevada
 Trailblazer Tavern San Francisco, Salesforce East, San Francisco, California
 Mi Almita, Honolulu, Hawaii
 Prime Grill, Dubai, UAE
 Cal Mare, MGM Springfield, Massachusetts

Closed restaurants 

 Arcadia. San Jose, California (closed, 2019)
 American Fish, Aria Resort & Casino, Las Vegas, Nevada (closed, 2015)
 International Smoke, Houston, Texas (closed)
 Nobhill Tavern, MGM Grand, Las Vegas, Nevada (closed, 2013)
 PABU. Four Seasons Hotel, Baltimore, Maryland (closed, 2014)
 Pub 1842. MGM Grand, Las Vegas, Nevada (closed, 2019 and rebranded as International Smoke)
 RN74. San Francisco, California (closed)
 RN74. Seattle, Washington (closed, 2021) 
 Seablue,  MGM Grand, Las Vegas, Nevada (closed, 2012 and rebranded as Pub 1842)
 Pizza And Burger, Fontainebleau Miami Beach, Florida (closed in 2022 and rebranded as Arcadia Grill)
 Stonehill Tavern.  Waldorf Astoria Monarch Beach, Monarch Beach, California (closed 2017, and rebranded as Bourbon Steak)

Television appearances
 Introduced by Hell's Kitchen show host Gordon Ramsay as a master chef, Michael Mina appeared in episode 208 as a food competition judge. Later, in episode 809, Chef Ramsay and the challenge winners visited his XIV restaurant, but Mina did not appear.
 In 2019, Mina appeared on the "Meze Fete" episode of "Guy's Ranch Kitchen" (season 2, episode 14) on the Food Network. At Guy Fieri's ranch Mina prepared salmon with a chermoula sauce and labneh, as well as melon with rosewater and pistachios.
In 2021, Mina appeared as a guest judge in MasterChef (American season 11) in Episode 6.

References

External links
 Official website
 Cook Taste Eat
 Travels in Taste
 Crazy Kitchen
 Michael Mina at Home (PhamFatale.com interview)

American restaurateurs
American chefs
American male chefs
Coptic chefs
Living people
Culinary Institute of America Hyde Park alumni
American people of Coptic descent
Egyptian emigrants to the United States
1969 births
Head chefs of Michelin starred restaurants
Culinary Institute of America people
James Beard Foundation Award winners
People from Ellensburg, Washington
American food writers
Chefs from San Francisco